The 1935 Pittsburgh Crawfords baseball team competed in Negro National League (NNL) during the 1935 baseball season. The team compiled a 51–26–3 record and won the NNL pennant. 

The team featured four players who were later inducted into the Baseball Hall of Fame: player/manager Oscar Charleston; center fielder Cool Papa Bell; catcher Josh Gibson; and third baseman Judy Johnson. 

The team's leading batters were:
 Second baseman Pat Patterson - .386 batting average with 23 extra-base hits and 41 RBIs
 Catcher Josh Gibson - .369 batting average with 10 home runs and 57 RBIs
 Center fielder Cool Papa Bell - .345 batting average and 12 stolen bases
 Left fielder Sam Bankhead - .338 batting average

The team's leading pitcher was Leroy Matlock who compiled an 8–0 record and 1.52 earned run average.

References

1935 in sports in Pennsylvania
Negro league baseball seasons